Sosnovskoye is a rural locality (a village) in Navlinsky District, Bryansk Oblast, Russia. The population was 40 as of 2010. There is 1 street.

Geography 
Sosnovskoye is located 22 km southwest of Navlya (the district's administrative centre) by road. Saltanovka is the nearest rural locality.

References 

Rural localities in Navlinsky District